Alembert and its variants may refer to:

People:
Jean le Rond d'Alembert (1717–1783), French mathematician, mechanician, physicist, philosopher, and music theorist
Sandy D'Alemberte (1933–2019), American lawyer and politician

Places:
D'Alembert (crater), a lunar impact crater

Mathematics and Physics:
d'Alembert's formula, a mathematical formula
d'Alembert's paradox, a statement concerning inviscid flow
d'Alembert's principle, a statement of the fundamental classical laws of motion
d'Alembert–Euler condition, a mathematical and physical condition
D'Alembert operator, an operator of the Einstein equation
Ratio test, also known as d'Alembert's test, a test for the convergence of a series